Hanuman is a 1998 French-Indian film directed by Frédéric Fougea. The film stars Scottish actor Robert Cavanah and Indian actress Tabu in the lead roles. The film was dubbed in Danish as Hanuman og abernes tempel with Henrik Koefoed, Vibeke Hastrup, and Søren Sætter-Lassen providing the voices of Tom, Anja, and Ashok, respectively. The film was alternatively titled as The Monkey Who Knew Too Much. It was the on-screen debut for Nithya Menen as a child artist.

Cast 
 Monkey as Hanou
 Robert Cavanah as Scotsman Tom
 Tabu as Anja
 Nathalie Auffret as Alice, a French woman
 Javed Jaffrey as Ashok, a rich politician
 Tom Alter as Tom's father
 Baby Nithya Menen as Munna, Anja's younger sister
 Khalid Tyabji as Deva, a monk
 Sidney Kean as Roberto
 Jim Adhi Limas as Louis
 Govind Raoa as Anja's father
 Veena Sajnani as the minister
 Hans Kaushik as Young Sadhu
 Paul Bandey as the auctioneer
 Yatin Karyekar as a local police officer
 Voice Cast
 William Doherty as the narrator

Awards and nominations

Release 
Carla Meyer of SF Gate praised the performances of Cavanah and the monkeys and wrote that "By the last third, "Hanuman" has become a pretty predictable good-versus- evil story. But the picture's great beauty, and the obvious care that it took to make it, override the triteness". Dennis Harvey of Variety similarly wrote that " Fougea’s deft orchestration of two trained and 50 wild monkeys — who make antic, appealing camera subjects — nicely suspends disbelief, while his brisk pacing makes the somewhat formulaic script go down easily". On the contrary, Jesper Vestergard of CinemaZone criticized the film and wrote that "The film's expression never manages to land a place where it can satisfy neither children nor adults, and the magical element of history with the monkey god never comes to its own".

References

External links  
 

1998 films
Films about monkeys
Films set in Asia
English-language Indian films
English-language French films
1990s English-language films